Gürgən-Pirallahı is a municipality in the Əzizbəyov raion of Baku, Azerbaijan. It has a population of 14,060.  The municipality consists of the villages of Gürgən and Pirallahı.

References

Municipalities of Baku